Notorious is the third album by Australian metalcore band Buried in Verona. The album was released on 16 October 2012 through UNFD and Artery Recordings. It is the first album to feature the bassist Daniel Gynn and guitarists Nate Martin and Sean Gynn. Notorious debuted at No. 20 on the ARIA Albums Chart. The deluxe edition of the album entitled Notorious: Reloaded was released on 13 June 2013 with 3 new songs.

Track listing

Personnel
Buried in Verona
Brett Anderson – Lead vocals
Nate Martin – guitar
Sean Gynn – guitar,  bass guitar on "I Am Hate"
Richie Newman – guitar, clean vocals, Lead Vocals track 5
Daniel Gynn – Bass guitar, lead guitar on "I Am Hate"
Chris Mellross – Drums
Conor Ward - Drums on "I Am Hate"

Additional personnel
Ahren Stringer (The Amity Affliction) - vocals on "Can't Let It Go"

Production
Fredrik Nordström - Producer, engineer

Charts

References

2012 albums
Buried in Verona albums
UNFD albums
Albums produced by Fredrik Nordström